Gina Liano (born 1966) is an Australian barrister, author, entrepreneur and television personality. She is best known for her role in The Real Housewives of Melbourne.

Early and personal life
Liano was born Georgina Caroline Italiano in Brighton, Victoria, to Italian parents Anita Bonollo and Nicola Italiano. She is one of four siblings. Her sisters Bettina Liano and Teresa Liano are both fashion designers. 

In 2003, Liano was diagnosed with cancer. She went into remission after 12 months of chemotherapy and radiation treatment. She has been divorced twice and is a single mother of two boys, and lives in Melbourne.

Career
In 1985, Liano went into business with her sisters running a chain of boutiques. Liano was admitted as a lawyer in 1997, and joined the Victorian Bar in 1999. She currently practices in criminal law, intentional torts, commercial law, family law and employment law.

Since 2014, Liano has appeared on the Australian reality television series The Real Housewives of Melbourne.

Her autobiography, Fearless, was published in April 2015. In the same month, Liano joined the cast of Neighbours as Mary Smith. Liano was hired after she impressed casting directors during a screen test. She began filming on 14 April 2015.

In 2015, Liano was a contestant in the fourth season of The Celebrity Apprentice Australia. She withdrew from the competition in the fourth week on medical advice.

In January 2016, it was announced Liano would make her theatre debut, in July 2016, as the wicked stepmother in the pantomime adaptation of Cinderella at The State Theatre in Sydney.

References

External links
Gina Liano at Bravo

1967 births
Living people
21st-century Australian actresses
21st-century Australian writers
21st-century Australian women writers
Australian autobiographers
Australian barristers
Australian people of Italian descent
Australian soap opera actresses
Australian women in business
Businesspeople from Melbourne
Lawyers from Melbourne
Monash Law School alumni
Monash University alumni
Participants in Australian reality television series
The Apprentice Australia candidates
The Real Housewives cast members
Television personalities from Melbourne
Australian women lawyers
Women autobiographers
The Real Housewives of Melbourne
People from Brighton, Victoria